Eichleriella is a genus of fungi in the order Auriculariales. Species produce effused or cupulate, waxy to leathery basidiocarps (fruit bodies)  on wood, with a smooth to spiny surface. The genus contains some twelve species. 

Molecular research, based on cladistic analysis of DNA sequences, has redefined the genus, with some species now placed in Heteroradulum and others transferred to Eichleriella from Heterochaete. Eichleriella was named by Italian mycologist Giacomo Bresadola in honour of Bogumił Eichler (1843 - 1905), Polish botanist and mycologist.

References

External links

Auriculariales
Agaricomycetes genera
Taxa named by Giacomo Bresadola